The Texas Purple Heart Medal, commonly referred to as the Texas Purple Heart, is the third highest military decoration that can be conferred to a service member of the Texas Military Forces. Subsequent decorations are conferred by a white enameled five-pointed star trimmed in gold device.

Eligibility
The Texas Purple Heart is conferred to any service member of the Texas Military Forces who was mobilized into service under command of the United States Armed Forces (Title 10) after 11 September 2001 and meets the criteria for decoration of the United States Purple Heart.

Authority 
The Texas Purple Heart Medal was established by Senator Kel Seliger in Senate Bill 955, authorized by the Seventy-ninth Texas Legislature, and approved by Governor Rick Perry on 17 June 2005, effective the same date.

Description

Medal 
The medal pendant is heart-shaped within a gold border, 1 3/8 inches wide, and containing a white star with green wreath. Above the heart shield is the front view of the Alamo. The reverse consists of a raised bronze heart with the words "FOR MILITARY MERIT" below the coat of arms and leaves. The pendant is suspended by a metal loop attached to a silk moiré ribbon, 1 3/8 inches wide and consisting of the following stripes: 1/8 inch White 67101; 1 1/8 inch Purple 67115; and 1/8 inch White 67101, and behind a large white enameled five-pointed star, trimmed in gold, 3/8 of an inch in circumscribing diameter and mounted in the center of the ribbon, one point up.

Device 
A white enameled five-pointed star, trimmed in gold, 3/8th of an inch in circumscribing diameter, is conferred for second and successive decorations. Stars will be worn centered on the ribbon, with one point up, in conjunction with the star that is part of the original decoration. A maximum of four stars, to include the star that is part of the original decoration, will be worn.

Recipients

See also 

 Awards and decorations of the Texas Military
 Awards and decorations of the Texas government

 Texas Military Forces
 Texas Military Department
 List of conflicts involving the Texas Military

External links 

 Texas Purple Heart Medal

References

Texas
Texas Military Forces
Texas Military Department